Si Dios me quita la vida (English title: If God takes away my life) is a Mexican telenovela produced by Pedro Damián and Juan Osorio for Televisa in 1995. This is a remake of the 1961 telenovela La leona starred by Amparo Rivelles and Ernesto Alonso.

Daniela Romo and César Évora starred as protagonists, while Omar Fierro and Alma Muriel starred as antagonists.

Plot
María Sánchez Amaro is a woman from a wealthy family, educated in the moral habits of the 20s, whose live revolves around three men: Alfredo, the seducer, whom she married and procreate a child, Enrico, mature man, noble and protector, with whom he formed a second marriage, and Antonio, who teaches her the promise of true love.

After suffering abuse and betrayal by Alfredo, she is alone with her daughter when he goes to jail. She goes forward with his beautiful voice, but when he was released he returns to harass, María falls into the arms of Enrico, captivated by his love and goodness, and therein lies the love and protection that she has always yearned.

Antonio then appears, as a man who received protection from Enrico when he fled his country, accused of a crime he did not commit. Enrico does not only work but also gave him the same affection that he gave his own son. Antonio falls madly in love with the wife of the man who most wants and respects, and she does, too, although both try to resist this tormented and impossible love.

Cast

Awards

References

External links

1995 telenovelas
Mexican telenovelas
1995 Mexican television series debuts
1995 Mexican television series endings
Spanish-language telenovelas
Television shows set in Veracruz
Televisa telenovelas